Vexillum coloscopulus is a species of sea snail, a marine gastropod mollusk, in the family Costellariidae, the ribbed miters.

Taxonomic remark
Vexillum coloscopulus [1 July 1961] was published earlier than V. filiareginae [1 Oct. 1961], so the first name taking priority.

Description
The length of the shell attains 9 mm.

Distribution
This marine species occurs off the Philippines.

References

 Turner H. (2001) Katalog der Familie Costellariidae Macdonald 1860 (Gastropoda: Prosobranchia: Muricoidea). Hackenheim: Conchbooks. 100 pp.

External links
  Cate, J. (1961). A new Vexillum (Mitridae) from the Philippine Islands. Veliger. 4(1): 4-6, pl. 1.
 Cate, J. (1961). A discussion of Vexillum regina (Sowerby, 1825) and related species, with description of a new subspecies. Veliger. 4(2): 76-85

coloscopulus
Gastropods described in 1961